The Amsterdam Sportsman and Sportswoman of the Year is an annual award given to sportspeople associated with Amsterdam (through birth or otherwise), organised since 1999 by the city's division for elite sport named Topsport Amsterdam in cooperation with the city council. Awards are also given for the "Coach of the Year" and the "Talent of the Year".

Amsterdam sporter of the year

Amsterdam Coach and Talent of the Year

See also 
 Dutch Sportsman of the year
 Rotterdam Sportsman of the year

References 
  Amsterdam Topsport

Sport in Amsterdam
Dutch sports trophies and awards
Awards established in 1999
1999 establishments in the Netherlands
Annual events in Amsterdam
Annual sporting events in the Netherlands